Herbert Fröhlich (9 December 1905 – 23 January 1991) FRS was a German-born British physicist.

Career

In 1927, Fröhlich entered Ludwig-Maximilians University in Munich to study physics, and received his doctorate under Arnold Sommerfeld in 1930. His first position was as Privatdozent at the University of Freiburg. Due to rising anti-Semitism and the Deutsche Physik movement under Adolf Hitler, and at the invitation of Yakov Frenkel, Fröhlich went to the Soviet Union, in 1933, to work at the Ioffe Physico-Technical Institute in Leningrad. During the Great Purge following the murder of Sergei Kirov, he fled to England in 1935. Except for a short visit to the Netherlands and a brief internment during World War II, he worked in Nevill Francis Mott's department, at the University of Bristol, until 1948, rising to the position of Reader. At the invitation of James Chadwick, he took the Chair for Theoretical Physics at the University of Liverpool.

In 1950 Bell Telephone Laboratories offered Fröhlich their endowed professorial position at Princeton University. However, at Liverpool he had a purely research post which was attractive to him. He was then newly married to an American, Fanchon Angst, who was studying linguistic philosophy at Somerville College, Oxford under P. F. Strawson, and who did not want to return to the United States at that time.

From 1973, he was Professor of Solid State Physics at the University of Salford, however, all the while maintaining an office at the University of Liverpool, where he gained emeritus status in 1976 and remained there until his death. During 1981, he was a visiting professor at Purdue University. He was nominated for the Nobel Prize in Physics in 1963 and in 1964.

Fröhlich, who pursued theoretical research notably in the fields of superconductivity and bioelectrodynamics, proposed a theory of coherent excitations in biological systems known as Fröhlich coherence. A system that attains this coherent state is known as a Fröhlich condensate, similar to room-temperature non-equilibrium Bose–Einstein condensation of quasiparticles.

Honours and awards
Fröhlich was elected a Fellow of the Royal Society (FRS) in 1951. In 1972 he was awarded the Deutsche Physikalische Gesellschaft Max-Planck Medal and in 1981 an Honorary Doctorate from Purdue University.

Books by Fröhlich
Herbert Fröhlich Elektronentheorie der Metalle. (Struktur und Eigenschaften der Materie in Eigendarstellung, Bd.18).  (Springer, 1936, 1969)
Herbert Fröhlich Elektronentheorie der Metalle (Ann Arbor: Edwards Brothers,  First US edition, in German, 1943) 
Herbert Fröhlich Theory of Dielectrics: Dielectric Constant and Dielectric Loss (Clarendon Press, 1949, 1958)
Herbert Fröhlich and F. Kremer Coherent Excitations in Biological Systems (Springer-Verlag, 1983) 
Herbert Fröhlich, editor Biological Coherence and Response to External Stimuli (Springer, 1988)

Personal life
Fröhlich was the son of Fanny Frida (née Schwarz) and Jakob Julius Fröhlich, members of an old-established Jewish family in their home town of Rexingen, and the brother of Albrecht Fröhlich, a mathematician who was elected Fellow of the Royal Society in 1976.

References

External links
 University of Liverpool: Fröhlich, Herbert FRS (1905–1991), Physicist 
 Did Herbert Fröhlich predict or postdict the isotope effect in superconductors?
 Artist statement by Fanchon Fröhlich with:
 A portrait of Herbert Fröhlich

1905 births
1991 deaths
Fellows of the Royal Society
Jewish emigrants from Nazi Germany to the United Kingdom
Academics of the University of Salford
Academics of the University of Liverpool
Academics of the University of Bristol
Jewish physicists
British physicists
20th-century British physicists
Optical physicists
Condensed matter physicists
Scientists from Baden-Württemberg
Semiconductor physicists
Fellows of Somerville College, Oxford
Ludwig Maximilian University of Munich alumni
Winners of the Max Planck Medal